Grapiúna Atlético Clube, commonly known as Grapiúna, is a Brazilian football club based in Itabuna, Bahia state.

History
The club was founded on October 12, 1998. Grapiúna finished in the second place in the Campeonato Baiano Second Level in 2001, when they lost the title to Palmeiras Nordeste.

Stadium
Grapiúna Atlético Clube play their home games at Estádio Luiz Viana Filho, nicknamed Itabunão. The stadium has a maximum capacity of 11,745 people.

References

Association football clubs established in 1998
Football clubs in Bahia
1998 establishments in Brazil